Ariston V. Delos Reyes (born February 16, 1950) is a retired vice admiral in the Armed Forces of the Philippines.

Education
Delos Reyes graduated salutatorian from Florentino Torres High School, Tondo, Manila in 1966. Thereafter, he went to study BS Mathematics at the University of the Philippines Diliman as a National Science Development Board (NSDB) scholar.  However, after one year, he opted to enter the Philippine Military Academy where he graduated No. 2 out of 108 cadets and received a special award for being number one in Mathematics in 1971. He also attended the Naval Staff Course at the Naval War College, New Port, Rhode Island, USA and General Staff Course at the Naval Command College, South Korea.  He also earned a master's degree in National Security Administration, with honors, from the National Defense College of the Philippines.

Key Positions in the AFP
Delos Reyes's appointments to key positions in the Armed Forces of the Philippines highlighted his merit-laden and brilliant military career of almost 39 years.  He served as Vice Chief of Staff from July 7, 2004, until his retirement on February 16, 2006.  He was also designated as  The Deputy Chief of Staff, AFP; Vice Commander, PN; the Deputy Chief of Staff for Plans, J5, GHQ; and Chief of Naval Staff, Headquarters, PN.

As Chief of the Office of Ethical Standards and Accountability (OESPA), Delos Reyes handled various cases on erring military officers and personnel. In 2004, he led the initial investigation against his classmate at the Philippine Military Academy Class 1971, then military comptroller Maj. Gen. Carlos F. Garcia.

Short Stint at DND
A day after his retirement from military service, Vice Admiral Delos Reyes was appointed as Presidential Assistant I, with the rank of Undersecretary.  He was given the opportunity to continue his career in public service through the Department of National Defense, where he was initially tasked to assist in defense acquisitions to implement the AFP Modernization Program.  From January 2007 until March 15, 2010, he held the post of Undersecretary for Internal Affairs and served as key adviser of the Secretary of National Defense on matters pertaining to personnel administration, information management, and general administration.

During his three-year stint at the DND, VAdm Delos Reyes chaired the investigations of alleged anomalies in bidding of AFP equipment, including the Night Capable Attack Helicopters (NCAH) and  mortar acquisition projects.  He also pushed for the adoption of comprehensive DND-wide Integrity Development Action Plan (IDAP) in cooperation with the Development Academy of the Philippines and the Office of the Ombudsman, as well as the ISO accreditation of selected DND bureaus and offices.

Awards
He earned 57 medals, including among others, seven Distinguished Service Stars, one Philippine Legion of Honor (Degree of Commander), two Philippine Legion of Honor (Degree of Officer), five Outstanding Achievement Medals, Distinguished Navy Cross, two Bronze Cross Medals, 19 Military Merit Medals, nine Military Commendation Medals.

He was also recipient of the following awards:

 Gawad sa Kaunlaran – For coming up with a proposal which led in the grant of laundry allowance to all AFP and PNP personnel effective January 1998, a benefit package worth about P 100 million per annum.
 Monetary Incentive Award (DND, 1991) – For discovering an error in computation of the unit price of URC 187 radio which resulted in overpayment of Vetronix by the AFP, the rectification of which resulted in government savings of more than P 3.8 million.
 Congratulatory Letter from the Secretary of National Defense dated February 7, 1991 – For having garnered a grade of 95.6 percent and ranking of  number 5 out of 24,895 examinees who passed the Civil Service Eligibility Test (Professional).  A total of 241, 552 individuals took the examination.
 Cavalier Award (PMAAA) for Military Professionalism in Naval Operations (CY 2000) – as Commander Naval Task Force 61, Zamboanga City from 23 March 1997 – 29 October 1998.
 NDCP Meritorious Service Award (2007)

Publications
He authored the manual “Lessons Learned from AFP Operations Against the Communist Party of the Philippines  -- New People’s Army” Volume II.

He was co-author of “Lessons Learned from AFP Operations Against the Communist Party of the Philippines – New People’s Army” Volume I and “Typhoon Doctrine for Mariners”.

References

External links
 Delos Reyes Named AFP Vice Chief of Staff
 Delos Reyes Assumes as TDCS, AFP
 Interview with Ces Drilon and Ricky Carandang
 Defense Official Probing Anomalies Fired
 Palace Fires DND Usec
 Issue on DND Usec's Sacking "Unnecessary Noise"
 DND's "Mr. Clean" Removed; All Palace Can Say is "So What?"
 GMA Replacing Officials En Masse
 Sacked Defense Exec Calls for Probe of Two Officials
 Malacañang Sacks DND's Internal Affairs Chief
 Mr. Clean Issue Just Won't Rest
 DND Thinks Undersecretary Misunderstood His Mandate
 Why was Undersecretary Delos Reyes Fired?
 DND Usec Sinibak ng Malacañang
 Statement of Defense Secretary Norberto Gonzales on Usec. Delos Reyes’ Departure from DND

Living people
1950 births
People from Bulacan
Filipino generals
Philippine Navy personnel
Philippine Military Academy alumni
Filipino military leaders
Recipients of the Philippine Legion of Honor
Recipients of Gawad sa Kaunlaran
Recipients of the Outstanding Achievement Medal
Recipients of the Bronze Cross Medal
Recipients of the Military Merit Medal (Philippines)
Arroyo administration personnel
Philippine Military Academy Class of 1971